Ejby is a suburb in greater Copenhagen in Glostrup Municipality, lying between Glostrup and Skovlunde. The municipality had a population of 22,357 as of 2015.

Ejby will have a station on the Greater Copenhagen Light Rail line which is due to open in 2025.

References

Copenhagen metropolitan area
Glostrup Municipality